The 22451 / 22452 Chandigarh–Bandra Terminus Superfast Express is a Superfast Express train belonging to Indian Railways that runs between  and  in India.

It operates as train number 22452 from Chandigarh Junction to Bandra Terminus and as train number 22451 in the reverse direction.

Coaches

The train has standard LHB rakes with a max speed of 110 kmph. The train consists of 22 coaches:

 1 AC II cum AC III Tier
 1 AC II Tier
 4 AC III Tier
 9 Sleeper Coaches
 5 General Unreserved
 2 End-on Generator

As is customary with most train services in India, coach composition may be amended at the discretion of Indian Railways depending on demand.

Service

22452  Chandigarh–Bandra Terminus Superfast Express covers the distance of 1605 kilometres in 27 hours 35 mins (58.19 km/hr) & in 28 hours 05 mins (57.15 km/hr) as 22451 Bandra Terminus–Chandigarh Superfast Express.

As the average speed of the train is above , as per Indian Railways rules, its fare includes a Superfast surcharge.

Routeing

Gallery

Schedule

Traction

Earlier, the train was hauled end to end by a Ludhiana-based WDM-3A locomotive.

It is now hauled by a Vadodara-based WAP-7 locomotive between Bandra Terminus and  handing over to a Ludhiana-based WDP-4D which powers the train for the remainder of its journey until Chandigarh Junction.

References 

Rail transport in Mumbai
Express trains in India
Rail transport in Gujarat
Rail transport in Maharashtra
Rail transport in Haryana
Rail transport in Rajasthan
Rail transport in Chandigarh
Railway services introduced in 2012